R83 may refer to:

 R83 (New York City Subway car)
 , a destroyer of the Royal Navy
 Romano R.83, a French fighter aircraft